Billboard Top Hits: 1991 is a compilation album released by Rhino Records in 2000, featuring ten hit recordings from 1991.

The track lineup includes six songs that reached the top of the Billboard Hot 100 chart. The remaining songs all reached the top five of the chart.

Track listing

Track information and credits taken from the album's liner notes.

References

2000 compilation albums
Billboard Top Hits albums